Here 'Tis (subtitled The Junior Mance Quintet Play the Music of Dizzy Gillespie) is an album by jazz pianist Junior Mance's Quintet featuring compositions associated with Dizzy Gillespie. It was recorded in 1992 and released on the Sackville label.

Reception

The Globe and Mail wrote that Mance "shows more than the blues-based style that has dominated his work lately; his solo version of 'Tunesia' sustains the CD's light mood but also reveals a side of the composition that's rarely, if ever, heard."

Track listing
All compositions by Dizzy Gillespie except where noted.
 "Here 'Tis" - 8:02
 "Woody 'n' You" - 6:16
 "Ow" - 9:51 	
 "Con Alma" - 4:51
 "Tour de Force" - 5:48
 "Tin Tin Deo" (Chano Pozo, Gil Fuller) - 9:44 	
 "I Waited for You" (Gillespie, Fuller) - 7:03 	
 "Blue 'n' Boogie" (Gillespie, Frank Paparelli) - 6:15 
 "A Night in Tunisia" (Gillespie, Paparelli) - 3:33

Recorded in Toronto, Canada on January 14, 1992 (tracks 2-5, 7 & 8) and January 16, 1992 (tracks 1, 6 & 9)

Personnel
Junior Mance - piano 
Bill McBirnie - flute (tracks 1-3, 6 & 8) 
Reg Schwager - guitar (tracks 1-3, 6 & 8)  
Kieran Overs - bass (tracks 1-8)
Norman Marshall Villeneuve - drums (tracks 1-8)

References

1992 albums
Junior Mance albums
Sackville Records albums
Dizzy Gillespie tribute albums